The Bok Kai Temple is a traditional Chinese temple in the city of Marysville, California, located at the corner of D and First Streets, and served as the center of what was a bustling Chinatown for a small town.

History
In 1854, five years after the first contingent of Chinese arrived in California to work the gold mines during the California Gold Rush, a temple was erected in Marysville to serve the immigrant population. The foremost of the gods that are worshiped is Xuan Wu, ( "Dark Warrior" or "Mysterious Warrior"), a Deity in Chinese religion believed to govern the northern region and rain, hence its place of reverence at Bok Kai Temple, or northern creek temple.

The original temple was destroyed by fire, and was replaced in 1880.  The temple remains a primary focus of the present Marysville Chinese community, who have dedicated themselves to preserving the temple.

Current use
The temple is infrequently used as an active place of worship, but is preserved as both a California Historical Landmark and as a protected property on the National Register of Historic Places.  A Bok Kai festival and parade is held annually in the spring, during which time the temple is opened for ceremonies as well as for interested parties to tour.  Other tours may be arranged by contacting the Temple caretaker.

References

Further reading

External links

 Bok Kai Temple - Friends of the Marysville Bok Kai Temple
 Bok Kai Festival - Chinese Community of Marysville, California

Buildings and structures in Yuba County, California
Chinese-American culture in California
Chinese-American history
Marysville, California
History of Yuba County, California
California Historical Landmarks
Properties of religious function on the National Register of Historic Places in California
National Register of Historic Places in Yuba County, California